The Joy of Motion is the third studio album by American instrumental progressive metal band Animals as Leaders. It was released on March 24, 2014, in Europe, March 25, 2014, in North America and on March 28, 2014, in Australia and New Zealand by Sumerian Records. The entire album was previously made available on YouTube on March 19, 2014.

Around 13,000 copies of The Joy of Motion were bought in the United States during the first week of its release. It debuted at No. 23 on the Billboard 200, the band's highest position on the chart.  It has sold 50,000 copies in the United States as of November 2016.

On March 25, 2014, the band played their album release show on the Seattle date of their tour with After the Burial and Chon to celebrate the album's release date.

A music video was produced for the song "Physical Education", featuring the band playing the song in a school gymnasium, intercut with comedic scenes involving Abasi, Reyes, and Garstka as the school's principal, teacher, and janitor, respectively.

Music
The Joy of Motion has been described as a blend of the band's usual progressive metal technicality with elements of electronic, Latin, and dance-pop.

Track listing

All tracks written by Animals as Leaders.

Personnel
Animals as Leaders
 Tosin Abasi – lead & rhythm guitars
 Javier Reyes – rhythm & lead guitars
 Matt Garstka – drums, percussion

Guest musicians
 Misha Mansoor (Periphery) – bass guitar (Except: 2, 6, 9), programming, keyboard (Tracks: 1, 2, 3, 4, 6, 8, 10)
 Adam "Nolly" Getgood (Periphery) – bass guitar (Tracks: 2, 6, 9)
 Diego Farias (Volumes) – programming (Tracks: 5, 7, 11)

Production
 Misha Mansoor – co-writing, pre-production
 Adam "Nolly" Getgood – production, engineering, mixing
 Diego Farias – co-writing, pre-production
 Forrester Savell – mastering
 Navene Koperweis – electronics production
 Sam Martin – drum-recording engineering
 Jeff Dunne – drum editing
 Chris Carder and Rose Marincil – photography
 Jay Wynne – artwork, design

References

2014 albums
Sumerian Records albums
Animals as Leaders albums